Kravarska planina (Serbian Cyrillic: Краварска планина) is a mountain in southern Serbia, near the town of Kuršumlija. Its highest peak Kravarska glava has an elevation of 1002 meters above sea level.

References

Mountains of Serbia